Boniface Kongin is an elite marathon runner from Iten, Kenya. Born March 16, 1990, Kongin grew up in an era that saw distance running records continually set by runners from Kenya and Ethiopia. He became a strong distance runner and placed high in several marathons before taking first place in the Pittsburgh Marathon in 2019. He then ran Grandma's Marathon in June and beat out four-time champion Elisha Barno and course record holder Dominic Ondoro while finishing with a time of 2:11:56. Then he proceeded to finish first in the Montreal Marathon in 2:15:18.

Personal Bests as of 2017
Marathon: 2:12:01 (2019 Grandma's Marathon USA)
Half-marathon: 1:02:02 (2014)
10K Road: 29:25 (2013)
10 Miles: 48:27 (2017)

References

Living people
1988 births
People from Elgeyo-Marakwet County
Kenyan male marathon runners